Outside In is a medical and youth service nonprofit organization in Portland, Oregon which provides primary care and "wraparound services" for low income and homeless clients.  It also has several other programs such as needle exchange program for drug addicts, and eligibility restricted tattoo removal service. The needle exchange has been the cause of community objection as well as cancellation of insurance policy and donors declining to give. It has reported that in fiscal year 2015-2016, it has given out 988,399 needles which was 20,962 more needles than what was returned. Founded in 1968 to serve youth, the organization has since continued to revise its services to meet the needs of its clients. Its services as described in October 2014 include medical care, mobile medical vans, tattoo removal, housing, education, counseling, and job training.

History
Outside In was founded in June 1968 by Dr. Charles Spray, Arnold Goldberg, and Mary Lu Zurcher as one of the first free community health clinics in the U.S. and one of the earliest on the West Coast, along with the Haight Ashbury Free Clinics and the Los Angeles Free Clinic.  The organization was founded to serve Portland's "alienated youth", some of whom had substance abuse problems and most of whom had mental health issues. It initially rented its Downtown Portland space from the First Unitarian Church of Portland. Spray helped found the organization after learning that the Unitarian church's youth coffeehouse space, Charix, was in danger of being shut down by the city and a group that had successfully shut down the Crystal Ballroom music venue because of its association with the 1960s drug culture. Outside In was told by its insurance carrier that all of the organization's policies would be cancelled if they were to start a needle exchange. It took the clinic a few years to find a replacement insurance carrier. The needle exchange program started in July 1989 was the first authorized exchange in the United States. It was started as a pilot project involving 125 drug addicts. Bud Clark, the mayor at the time expressed concerns that it maybe seen by some as encouraging drug use. In September 2002, Portland Business Journal reported some prospective donors refuse to donate to Outside In, because of its needle exchange program.

Some of the group's early work involved staffing a 24-hour crisis hotline that was later spun off to form the Metro Crisis Intervention Service.

In November 2017, two staff members were stabbed on the job;  as a result, in May 2018 the workers of Outside In voted to unionize, with Oregon AFSCME as their parent union.

In April 2019, Outside In announced that it was expanding to add a second location in Gresham that was slated to open in Spring 2020 to serve transients and low-income people. According to its development director, Outside In helps "unique populations that are not well-served in other health care settings,". Willamette Week reported in April 2019 that Outside In employees are members of AFSCME along with a handful of other private nonprofits heavily funded by government contracts.
	
A second clinic location focused on families in need opened in the Rockwood neighborhood in Gresham in September 2020.

Services
Outside In is a Federally Qualified Health Center (FQHC) and a licensed mental health agency. Outside In operates a needle exchange for drug addicts. The syringe exchange, implemented in 1989, was the first one to be developed and the third to go into operation in the country. The needle exchange program has been operating a fentanyl testing service on street drugs for about two years where subjects bring samples of their illegal drugs or drug residues from paraphernalia as told to Oregon Public Broadcasting. The article said drug possession remains strictly illegal. In 2013–2014, the organization self reported it served 966 youth with mental health care, drug and alcohol treatment, employment, education, job training, and housing. Outside In's medical clinic was the medical home for 5,384 people in 2014. The same year, the group's syringe exchange served 4,322 people.

The organization's tattoo removal service is a restricted eligibility service offered at an off-site location at 1719 W Burnside St. Access is restricted to applicants with an income not exceeding 200% federal poverty guideline.

Community Objection 

The needle exchange program offered through Outside In and Multnomah County was the subject of a grievance by the adjacent neighborhood Goose Hollow Foothills League due to concerns that needles handed out by Outside In are littered in Goose Hollow by its drug addict clients. The neighborhood association sent a letter on the matter of needles and other supplies given out by Outside In to a Multnomah County Commissioner Sharon Meieran in February 2018. This letter was published in part in Portland Tribune
"We are drowning in the needles put out into the community by Multnomah County," said a letter complaining about the health department program that was sent to Commissioner Sharon Meieran by the Goose Hollow Foothills League last month. "Our residents are picking up hundreds of needles each week," the letter states. "Our neighborhood has experienced a shocking increase in unsafe and unsanitary levels of needles since MCHD started this program ... while keeping drug addicts safer, MCHD is risking the health of thousands more with this program.

"Our neighborhood is also filled with bloody cotton balls and feces-covered wipes that were given out at Outside In," added the letter, which was signed by Tracy Prince, the league's vice chair. "It is humane and necessary to hand out these items, but MCHD should put a plan in place so that these items aren't disposed of in our neighborhoods."In May 2019, a Portland activist Brandon Farley who believes the needle exchange add to a city's addiction and homelessness problems dumped out syringe caps and dirty syringes on the sidewalk in front of the Outside In's needle exchange in what he calls as an "act of civil disobedience".

Age restricted services 
Some of the services offered are eligibility restricted to clients 16–24 years of age.

Job training 
"Bespoke" is bicycle-powered smoothie cart set up in Portland's O'Bryant Square that gives homeless youth on-the-job training.

In 2005 the organization set up Virginia Woof, a non-profit dog daycare centre to provide training and employment for their clients. It operates in two locations.

Auxiliary services
In addition to the fixed location clinic, Outside In's medical clinic operates two medical outreach vans and a school-based health center at Milwaukie High School.

See also 

Emergency shelter
Homelessness in the United States

References

External links
 

1968 establishments in Oregon
Homelessness in Oregon
Homelessness organizations
Organizations based in Portland, Oregon
Organizations established in 1968